Marcus Tristam Bean (born 2 January 1984) is a retired professional footballer who played as a midfielder in the English Football League, most notably for Brentford and Wycombe Wanderers. Born in England, he represented Jamaica at full international level.

Club career

Early career
Born in Hammersmith, London, Bean started his youth career at local club St Joseph's, where he excelled playing his role in centre midfield, before deciding on moving on to successful youth club Northolt Villa. He captained the club to multiple trophies with dynamic midfield displays, regularly winning player of the season awards before eventually being scouted and moving to his first professional club, Queens Park Rangers at eleven years old.

Queens Park Rangers
Coming up through the youth ranks with QPR, Bean made his debut as a substitute at Wycombe in August 2002 only to suffer the ignominy of a second half red card in a game that saw four players receive their marching orders. His first start came in a comprehensive 4–0 victory at Mansfield a fortnight later and although he made only eight league and cup appearances throughout 2002–03, his obvious talent and composure mark him out as a great prospect for the future.

Bean was a member of the Second Division promotion winning squad of 2003–04 and saw him awarded Rangers' Young Player of the Year, an accolade he earned with his energetic style and break-up play, which allowed the more skilled-of-foot to create the play which saw Rangers' promoted to the Championship.

After limited chances to play first team football came his way, Bean took up two loan spells to Swansea during 2005. He made 17 league appearances for the Swans in both stints scoring one goal.

Blackpool
Bean did not make a first-team appearance for Blackpool between the Seasiders' 4–2 win over Aldershot in the third round of the FA Cup on 6 January 2007 and their 3–1 league victory at Bradford City on 26 March, and joined Rotherham United on a one-month loan on 9 August 2007. The loan was extended until the end of October, and "Beano" scored his first goal for the Millers in their 3–2 win over Mansfield Town.

It was a frustrating second season with Blackpool for Bean, after helping them avoid relegation in his first and assisting them in promotion to the championship in his second, although playing a limited number of games and considering retiring from football. On 7 May 2008, Bean was released by Blackpool.

Brentford
Brentford signed Bean in the summer of 2008 after he was released by Blackpool. He was part of the Brentford squad that won the League Two championship in 2008–09 and scored 9 goals from midfield. He notched up his 100th Football League appearance for Brentford on the final day of the 2010–11 season and passed 150 appearances for The Bees in all competitions. His form at the start of the 2011–12 season earned him a call-up to the Jamaican national squad.

Colchester United
On 8 June 2012, Bean signed for Colchester United on a three-year deal following his release from Brentford. He made his debut for the Essex club on 18 August 2012 in a 0–0 League One draw with Preston North End He scored his first goal for Colchester on 22 October 2013 in a 1–1 draw with Shrewsbury Town at the New Meadow. He netted the opening goal in a 2–2 draw at his former club Rotherham on 2 November for his second goal, and scored his third for the season in a 4–2 win against Carlisle United at Brunton Park on 18 January 2014. Bean's scoring form continued by grabbing a consolation goal as Colchester fell to a 2–1 defeat at Leyton Orient on 1 March. On 26 April, he scored the opening goal in a 4–1 win against his former club, who were already promoted from League One, in a result that meant that Colchester were all but safe from relegation.

Portsmouth loan
On 21 November 2014 Bean joined League Two club Portsmouth on loan until 3 January 2015. He made his debut on 22 November in Pompey's 3–0 home win over Morecambe. He scored his first goal for Portsmouth in his third game for the club, netting a curling effort in a 3–2 defeat to Accrington Stanley on 13 December.

Wycombe Wanderers
On 9 January 2015, he signed for League 2 club Wycombe Wanderers on an 18-month contract after being released by Colchester United. Bean had just returned to Colchester having had a short loan spell at fellow League 2 club Portsmouth. Portsmouth had also expressed an interest in signing Bean but only on a short-term basis. Bean opted for Wycombe and linking up again with Gareth Ainsworth, whom he knows from his QPR days. He was released by Wycombe at the end of the 2018–19 season. He announced his retirement in July 2019.

International career
Bean made a single appearance for Jamaica in a 2–1 game against Honduras in  October 2011. He came on as a substitute with 15 minutes to go as the "Reggae Boyz" recorded a fifth straight defeat .

Career statistics

Club

International

Honours

Queens Park Rangers
 Football League Second Division second-place promotion: 2003–04

Blackpool
 Football League One play-offs: 2007

Brentford
 Football League Two: 2008–09

Wycombe Wanderers
 EFL League Two third-place promotion: 2017–18

Individual
 Queens Park Rangers Young Player of the Year: 2003–04
 Football League Two Player of the Month: December 2008

References

External links
 

1984 births
Living people
Citizens of Jamaica through descent
English sportspeople of Jamaican descent
Jamaican footballers
English footballers
Footballers from Hammersmith
Association football midfielders
Jamaica international footballers
English Football League players
Swansea City A.F.C. players
Queens Park Rangers F.C. players
Blackpool F.C. players
Rotherham United F.C. players
Brentford F.C. players
Colchester United F.C. players
Portsmouth F.C. players
Wycombe Wanderers F.C. players
Brentford F.C. non-playing staff